Lobki is a rural locality (a selo) in Pogarsky District, Bryansk Oblast, Russia. The population was 229 as of 2013. There are 5 streets.

Geography 
Lobki is located 11 km southwest of Pogar (the district's administrative centre) by road. Borshchovo is the nearest rural locality.

References 

Rural localities in Pogarsky District